Oobius is a parasitic non-stinging wasp genus in the family Encyrtidae.

Species 
 Oobius agrili
 Oobius batocerae
 Oobius buprestidis
 Oobius dahlsteni
 Oobius depressus
 Oobius longoi
 Oobius minusculus
 Oobius nearcticus
 Oobius whiteorum

See also 
 List of encyrtid genera

References 

 Triapitsyn, Petrice, T.R., Gates, M.W., Bauer, L.S. 2015: Two new species of Oobius Trjapitzin (Hymenoptera, Encyrtidae) egg parasitoids of Agrilus spp. (Coleoptera, Buprestidae) from the US, including a key and taxonomic notes on other congeneric Nearctic taxa. Zookeys, 498: 29-50, 
 

Encyrtinae
Hymenoptera genera